AB Airlines was an airline with its head office in the Enterprise House on the property of London Stansted Airport in Uttlesford, Essex. AB was one of the first 'low-cost airlines' in England, preceding others such as EasyJet, Ryanair, and Go Fly. It was created in 1993 by former Brymon Airways executives. AB Airlines was formerly known as Air Bristol. Initially the airline marketed itself as Air Belfast, reflecting its then principal route between Belfast International Airport and London Stansted. Aircraft and crew were based at Belfast International Airport, London Stansted Airport and Bristol Filton Airport. A base was opened in 1994 at Shannon Airport to operate flights to London Gatwick Airport. This operation was marketed as AB Shannon.

When a base was set up at London Gatwick the name was changed to AB Airlines as its network covered more destinations than just Shannon. It mainly flew scheduled services from London Gatwick to Shannon, Lisbon and Berlin Schönefeld, and also from London Stansted and Birmingham International Airport to Shannon. It also offered charter flights to holiday destinations in Europe.

After heavy financial losses, a large number of dropped schedules, and major restructuring within the company, AB Airlines went into administration in August 1999. Its last remaining scheduled services from London Gatwick to Nice in France and Shannon in Ireland were taken over by British Airways.

AB Airlines chairman Brian Beal later went on to start another low-cost airline, Fly Europa.

Fleet
AB Airlines fleet consisted of Boeing 737-300s, a single Boeing 737-400 and BAC 1-11s. In May 1998 Boeing announced that AB Airlines had placed orders for six Boeing 737-700 aircraft, making it the first airline in Europe to do so. However, with the financial problems of the company followed by insolvency the following year, AB Airlines went into administration and its remaining services have since been taken over by British Airways.

See also
 List of defunct airlines of the United Kingdom

References

External links 

 News story about staff reaction
 News articles relating to AB Airlines intended purchase of new Boeing 737-700's.
 AB Airlines

Defunct airlines of the United Kingdom
Airlines established in 1993
Airlines disestablished in 1999
1993 establishments in England
1999 disestablishments in England
British companies established in 1993
British companies disestablished in 1999